Dol pri Trebnjem is a small settlement in the Municipality of Trebnje in eastern Slovenia. It lies just north of Trebnje itself, off the regional road leading to Mirna. The area is part of the historical region of Lower Carniola. The municipality is now included in the Southeast Slovenia Statistical Region.

Name
The name of the settlement was changed from Dol to Dol pri Trebnjem in 1955.

References

External links

Dol pri Trebnjem at Geopedia

Populated places in the Municipality of Trebnje